In mathematics, equivariant cohomology (or Borel cohomology) is a cohomology theory from algebraic topology which applies to topological spaces with a group action.  It can be viewed as a common generalization of group cohomology and an ordinary cohomology theory. Specifically, the equivariant cohomology ring of a space  with action of a topological group  is defined as the ordinary cohomology ring with coefficient ring  of the homotopy quotient :

If G acts freely on X, then the canonical map  is a homotopy equivalence and so one gets:

Definitions 
It is also possible to define the equivariant cohomology 
-module A; these are abelian groups. 
This construction is the analogue of cohomology with local coefficients.

The construction should not be confused with other cohomology theories,
such as Bredon cohomology or the cohomology of invariant differential forms: if G is a compact Lie group, then, by the averaging argument, any form may be made invariant; thus, cohomology of invariant differential forms does not yield new information.

Koszul duality is known to hold between equivariant cohomology and ordinary cohomology.

Relation with groupoid cohomology 
For a Lie groupoid  equivariant cohomology of a smooth manifold is a special example of the groupoid cohomology of a Lie groupoid. This is because given a -space  for a compact Lie group , there is an associated groupoidwhose equivariant cohomology groups can be computed using the Cartan complex  which is the totalization of the de-Rham double complex of the groupoid. The terms in the Cartan complex arewhere  is the symmetric algebra of the dual Lie algebra from the Lie group , and  corresponds to the -invariant forms. Then,For example,since the -action on the dual Lie algebra is trivial.

Homotopy quotient 

To this end, construct the universal bundle EG → BG for G and recall that EG admits a free G-action.  Then the product EG × X —which is homotopy equivalent to X since EG is contractible—admits a “diagonal” G-action defined by (e,x).g = (eg,g−1x): moreover, this diagonal action is free since it is free on EG.  So we define the homotopy quotient XG to be the orbit space (EG × X)/G of this free G-action.

In other words, the homotopy quotient is the associated X-bundle over BG obtained from the action of G on a space X and the principal bundle EG → BG. This bundle X → XG → BG is called the Borel fibration.

An example of a homotopy quotient 

Let X be a complex projective algebraic curve. We identify X as a topological space with the set of the complex points , which is a compact Riemann surface. Let G be a complex simply connected semisimple Lie group. Then any principal G-bundle on X is isomorphic to a trivial bundle, since the classifying space  is 2-connected and X has real dimension 2.

Equivariant characteristic classes 
(In order to apply Chern–Weil theory, one uses a finite-dimensional approximation of EG.)

Alternatively, one can first define an equivariant Chern class and then define other characteristic classes as invariant polynomials of Chern classes as in the ordinary case; for example, the equivariant Todd class of an equivariant line bundle is the Todd function evaluated at the equivariant first Chern class of the bundle. (An equivariant Todd class of a line bundle is a power series (not a polynomial as in the non-equivariant case) in the equivariant first Chern class; hence, it belongs to the completion of the equivariant cohomology ring.)

Localization theorem 

The localization theorem is one of the most powerful tools in equivariant cohomology.

See also 
Equivariant differential form
Kirwan map
Localization formula for equivariant cohomology
GKM variety
Bredon cohomology

Notes

References

Relation to stacks 

 PDF page 10 has the main result with examples.

Further reading

External links 
 — Excellent survey article describing the basics of the theory and the main important theorems

What is the equivariant cohomology of a group acting on itself by conjugation?

Algebraic topology
Homotopy theory
Symplectic topology
Group actions (mathematics)